S-Network Global Indexes, Inc. is a publisher and developer of proprietary and custom indexes. Founded in 1997, S-Network specializes in smart beta and thematic indexes that serve as the basis for ETFs.

Starting in 2006, S-Network began publishing specialty indexes covering sub-sectors and investment themes including the Alternative Energy, Automotive, Nuclear Energy,Space Poliwogg Medical Breakthroughs, Gaming, Maritime, Infrastructure, Hard Assets and Emerging Markets sectors.

In 2014, Thomson Reuters partnered with S-Network to develop a new family of environmental, social and corporate governance indices. On July 20, 2017, the index family was rebranded the Thomson Reuters/S-Network ESG Best Practices Ratings & Indices, reflecting changes to the methodology.

S-Network indexes have been licensed to a number of financial intermediaries in the US and Europe and serve as the basis for ETFs, Structured Products, mutual funds and UITs. S-Network indexes are also used for benchmarking and passive asset management purposes.

References 

Financial services companies established in 2006
Indexes